Jameer Thurman (born January 20, 1995) is a gridiron football linebacker for the Hamilton Tiger-Cats of the Canadian Football League (CFL). He played college football for the Indiana State Sycamores from 2013 to 2016.

Professional career

Calgary Stampeders
Thurman spent two seasons with the Calgary Stampeders of the Canadian Football League. Playing in all 18 regular season games during his rookie season in 2017, Thurman recorded 52 tackles, as well as 13 more special teams tackles, a sack, two interceptions, and two forced fumbles. Calgary made it to the 105th Grey Cup, but lost the championship game to the Toronto Argonauts. Thurman recorded 7 tackles during the game, and also sacked Argos quarterback Ricky Ray. The 2018 season again ended with a trip to the Grey Cup; this time it was a victory. Calgary's win in the 106th Grey Cup was the organization's 8th title. In that game, Thurman had two more tackles and a forced fumble, while overall on the year he played in 17 games, upping his tackles to 82 defensive tackles, 16 specials teams tackles, two more sacks, an interception, and a forced fumble.

Chicago Bears
Thurman signed with the Chicago Bears in January 2019. Thurman managed 16 tackles during the preseason, but did not make the roster, being waived on August 31, 2019.

DC Defenders
In October 2019, Thurman was selected by the DC Defenders in the 2020 XFL Draft. Despite the season ending after 5 games due to the COVID-19 pandemic, Thurman made 28 tackles, an interception, and forced a fumble. Pro Football Focus listed Thurman as one of the highest graded players.  He had his contract terminated when the league suspended operations on April 10, 2020.

Calgary Stampeders (II)
On January 19, 2021, it was announced that Thurman had re-signed with the Calgary Stampeders. He played for two seasons with the Stampeders and became a free agent upon the expiry of his contract on February 14, 2023.

Hamilton Tiger-Cats
On February 15, 2023, it was announced that Thurman had signed with the Hamilton Tiger-Cats.

References

External links
Hamilton Tiger-Cats bio
Indiana State bio

1995 births
Living people
American football linebackers
American players of Canadian football
Calgary Stampeders players
Canadian football linebackers
DC Defenders players
Hamilton Tiger-Cats players
Indiana State Sycamores football players
People from Bellwood, Illinois
Players of American football from Illinois
Sportspeople from Cook County, Illinois